Tax investigation is an in-depth investigation processed by a tax authority in order to recover tax undercharged in previous years of assessment. This is the general term in commonwealth countries. It is carried out when a taxpayer is suspected of tax evasion, or just by random sampling.

References

See also
 Income tax audit
 Tax collection 
 Tax administration